The Greek Orthodox Cathedral of the Annunciation  is a church of the Greek Orthodox Archdiocese of America located in Baltimore, Maryland.  It is the oldest of the 18 Greek Orthodox parishes in Maryland.  The cathedral is an important center of Greek-American culture in Baltimore, and hosts an annual Greek Food Festival.

History
The Greek Orthodox Cathedral of the Annunciation building was constructed in 1888 (the building originally housed a Protestant congregation), however the current congregation was established in 1906 and only moved to the building in 1937. The cathedral was meant primarily to serve the Greek-American community in Baltimore.

In 1975 the cathedral was designated as the state of Maryland's first Greek Orthodox cathedral.

In 1992 the cathedral received a historic designation from the Maryland Commission on Historic and Architectural Preservation.

Architecture
The building's overall design is in the Neo-Byzantine style.

References

External links
 
 
 Orthodox Maryland - Greek Orthodox Cathedral of the Annunciation

1906 establishments in Maryland
Byzantine Revival architecture in Maryland
Cathedrals in Maryland
Churches completed in 1888
Church buildings with domes
Greek Orthodox
Eastern Orthodox churches in Maryland
Greek-American culture in Baltimore
Greek Orthodox cathedrals in the United States
Midtown, Baltimore
Christian organizations established in 1906